Athrips gerasimovi is a moth of the family Gelechiidae. It is found in Mongolia.

The wingspan is 12–15 mm. The forewings are greyish brown with three yellow fasciae and five black spots along the longitudinal axis of the wing. The hindwings are grey. Adults are on wing from August to early September.

References

Moths described in 1982
Athrips
Moths of Asia